ALTEX: Alternatives to Animal Experimentation is a quarterly peer-reviewed scientific journal covering alternatives to animal experimentation and related issues of bioethics, seeking to promote the replacement, reduction, and refinement of animal use in research (the "3Rs"). It was originally published in German and established in 1984 as ALTEX: Alternativen zu Tierexperimenten and is published by Springer Spektrum on behalf of the Swiss Society ALTEX Edition.

It is the official journal of Center for Alternatives to Animal Testing, the American Society for Cellular and Computational Toxicology, the European consensus platform for alternatives, the European Society for Alternatives to Animal Testing, and the transatlantic think tank for toxicology. It has been an open access journal since 2011 under a Creative Commons Attribution 4.0 license.

The journal has two companion publications: ALTEX Proceedings, which publishes proceedings of scientific conferences relating to the 3Rs, and TIERethik, a biannual German-language periodical on bioethics and human-animal studies.

Abstracting and indexing
The journal is abstracted and indexed in Index Medicus/MEDLINE/PubMed, Science Citation Index Expanded, Scopus, and Embase. 
According to the Journal Citation Reports, the journal has a 2020 impact factor of  6.043.

References

External links
 
 Johns Hopkins University Center for Alternatives to Animal Testing

Alternatives to animal testing
Animal ethics journals
Bioethics journals
Creative Commons Attribution-licensed journals
Biology journals
Springer Science+Business Media academic journals
Publications established in 1984
English-language journals
Quarterly journals